Mettakkivalasa is a suburb in Amadalavalasa Town, India. It is located close to other bigger suburbs such as Amadalavalasa and Chintada. Srikakulam Road Railway Station is in Mettakkivalasa Suburb of Amadalavalasa town, It is close to the Srikakulam Road Railway Quarters, It is about 10 Kilometers from Srikakulam City.

Geography 
Mettakkivalasa is located at 18.4167°N 83.9000°E.It has an average elevation of 29 metres (98 feet).

Streets 
There are many streets in Mettakkivalasa region, Kuppili vari street, Teachers Colony, Putta veedhi, Manukonda vari street, Kothaagraharam, Golla veedhi, BR Nagar, Hudco Colony, Amma Nagar, JK Baniyan Street.

Electricity Board 
APEPDCL, Andhra Pradesh Eastern Power Distribution is the official power supply board in Amadalavalasa Municipality, it serves all over Mettakkivalasa region.

Water Supply 
Amadalavalasa Municipality serves water to the Mettakkivalasa region, currently Amadalavalasa municipality has 100+ public water taps and more than 500 private water connections in mettakkivalasa region serving one hour water supply in a day.

Temples 
There are 4 temples in Mettakkivalasa region, Mettakkivalasa Varala Vinayaka Temple located in Main Road, Satya Sai Baba Temple, Shiridi sai baba Temple, Varaha Narasimha Temple

Municipality 
Amadalavalasa is a municipality and also the mandal headquarters of Amadalavalasa mandal. The town is spread over an area of 19.65 km2 (7.59 sq mi), which is under the jurisdiction of Visakhapatnam Urban Development Authority, Mettakkivalasa suburb belongs to Amadalavalasa Municipality.

References 

Srikakulam district